Local elections in Caloocan were held on May 13, 2019, within the Philippine general election. The voters elected for the elective local posts in the city: the mayor, vice mayor, the two Congressmen, and the councilors, six in each of the city's two legislative districts.

Background 
Incumbent Mayor Oscar Malapitan sought for third and final term against Rufino "Ruffy" Bayon-on, Ronnie Malunes, Edgardo "Ed" Sevilla, Maximo "Max" Torrelino, and Emil Trinidad. 

Incumbent Vice Mayor Macario "Maca" Asistio III sought for third and final term unopposed.

Incumbent First District Rep. Dale Gonzalo "Along" Malapitan sought for second term unopposed. 

Incumbent Second District Rep. Edgar "Egay" Erice sought for third and final term against Noel Cabuhat.

Results

For Representatives

First District

Second District

For Mayor

For Vice Mayor

For Councilor

First District 

|-bgcolor=black
|colspan=5|

Second District 

|-bgcolor=black
|colspan=5|

References

External links 

 https://comelec.gov.ph/php-tpls-attachments/2019NLE/ListsOfCandidates/TentativeListsofCandidates/LOCAL/NCR/THIRDDISTRICT.pdf

 https://comelec.gov.ph/php-tpls-attachments/2019NLE/ListsOfCandidates/TentativeListsofCandidates/LOCAL/NCR/NCRHOUSEOFREP.pdf

2019 Philippine local elections
Elections in Caloocan
May 2019 events in the Philippines
2019 elections in Metro Manila